Semyonovka is a rural locality (a selo) in Ust-Pogozhinskoye Rural Settlement, Dubovsky District, Volgograd Oblast, Russia. The population was 280 as of 2010. There are 4 streets.

Geography 
Semyonovka is located in steppe, on the Pogozhaya River, 72 km northwest of Dubovka (the district's administrative centre) by road. Ust-Pogozhye is the nearest rural locality.

References 

Rural localities in Dubovsky District, Volgograd Oblast